Chanodichthys oxycephalus is a species of ray-finned fish in the genus Chanodichthys from the Yangtze River.

References 

Chanodichthys
Taxa named by Pieter Bleeker
Fish described in 1871